Otsego is a city in Wright County, Minnesota, United States.  It is a northwest suburb within the Minneapolis–Saint Paul metropolitan area. It had a population of 19,966 at the 2020 census. Following the 2020 census, Otsego was determined to be the largest city in Wright County, and the 60th largest in Minnesota. Minnesota State Highway 101 and Interstate 94 serve as the main routes in the city.

History
Otsego first became an organized township in 1858, and was named after Otsego County, New York. The township incorporated as the city of Otsego in 1990.

Geography
Otsego is located at the confluence of the Mississippi and Crow Rivers.

Otsego is located approximately 30 miles Northwest of Downtown Minneapolis via I-94.

Nearby places include Albertville, St. Michael, Rogers, Elk River, Dayton, and Monticello.

Climate
Otsego has a Humid continental climate with cold, snowy winters and hot, humid summers. As is typical in the Upper Midwest. Otsego experiences a full range of precipitation and related weather events, including snow, sleet, ice, rain, thunderstorms, and fog. Temperatures can exceed 100 °F during summer months and fall below 0 °F in winter. Due to Urban Heat Island, Otsego is often a few degrees colder than downtown Minneapolis during the winter months.

Demographics

2010 census
As of the census of 2010, there were 13,571 people, 4,736 households, and 3,560 families living in the city. The racial makeup of the city was 93.2% White, 1.8% African American, 0.4% Native American, 1.8% Asian, 0.1% Pacific Islander, 0.8% from other races, and 1.9% from two or more races. Hispanic or Latino of any race were 2.4% of the population.

There were 4,736 households, of which 44.5% had children under the age of 18 living with them, 62.9% were married couples living together, 7.4% had a female householder with no husband present, 4.9% had a male householder with no wife present, and 24.8% were non-families. 17.9% of all households were made up of individuals, and 2.8% had someone living alone who was 65 years of age or older. The average household size was 2.86 and the average family size was 3.29.

The median age in the city was 31.8 years. 30.9% of residents were under the age of 18; 6.7% were between the ages of 18 and 24; 35.3% were from 25 to 44; 21.5% were from 45 to 64; and 5.7% were 65 years of age or older. The gender makeup of the city was 50.7% male and 49.3% female.

2000 census
As of the census of 2000, there were 6,389 people, 2,062 households, and 1,674 families living in the city. The racial makeup of the city was 97.26% White, 0.25% African American, 0.36% Native American, 0.72% Asian, 0.56% from other races, and 0.85% from two or more races. Hispanic or Latino of any race were 1.27% of the population. 41.0% were of German, 16.1% Norwegian, 7.0% Swedish, 6.9% Irish and 6.1% American ancestry according to Census 2000.

There were 2,062 households, out of which 46.9% had children under the age of 18 living with them, 71.0% were married couples living together, 5.4% had a female householder with no husband present, and 18.8% were non-families. 12.7% of all households were made up of individuals, and 2.6% had someone living alone who was 65 years of age or older.  The average household size was 3.10 and the average family size was 3.41.

In the city, the population was spread out, with 32.5% under the age of 18, 7.7% from 18 to 24, 34.2% from 25 to 44, 21.4% from 45 to 64, and 4.2% who were 65 years of age or older.  The median age was 32 years. For every 100 females, there were 108.8 males.  For every 100 females age 18 and over, there were 109.1 males.

The median income for a household in the city was $57,422, and the median income for a family was $59,319. Males had a median income of $39,568 versus $28,273 for females. The per capita income for the city was $20,209.  About 3.1% of families and 3.2% of the population were below the poverty line, including 2.4% of those under age 18 and 13.8% of those age 65 or over.

Politics

Education
A portion of the city is in the St. Michael-Albertville Schools district., The majority of the City is In the Elk River/ Rogers, Minnesota School District.  The far western side of Otsego is in the Monticello School District.

Rogers High School serves the community.

References

External links
 City Website

Cities in Wright County, Minnesota
Cities in Minnesota
Minnesota populated places on the Mississippi River